Aeluropus is a genus of Eurasian and African plants in the grass family, found primarily in desert regions.

 Species
 Aeluropus badghyzii Tzvelev - Turkmenistan
 Aeluropus laciniatus Khodash. - Iran
 Aeluropus lagopoides (L.) Thwaites - Mediterranean, Sahara, and Asia from Mauritania + Sicily to Kazakhstan + Nicobar Islands
 Aeluropus littoralis (Gouan) Parl. - Mediterranean + Asia from Spain + Morocco to China
 Aeluropus macrostachyus Hack. - Iran, Afghanistan, Pakistan
 Aeluropus pilosus (X.L.Yang) S.L.Chen & X.L.Yang - Xinjiang

 formerly included
see Dactylis Odyssea 
 Aeluropus arabicus - Odyssea mucronata 
 Aeluropus mucronatus - Odyssea mucronata 
 Aeluropus pungens (Vahl) Boiss 1884 not K.Koch 1848 - Odyssea mucronata
 Aeluropus smithii - Dactylis smithii

See also
 List of Poaceae genera

References

Poaceae genera
Chloridoideae